Liis Emajõe (born 21 August 1991) is a retired Estonian football player and currently a women's soccer coach for the Maine Black Bears. She played as a striker for Flora Tallinn in the Naiste Meistriliiga, as well as the Estonian national team. In 2010, she was named Estonian Female Young Footballer of the Year.

She scored Estonia's first goal in the 2013 Euro's qualification in a 2–1 loss against Belarus.

Her younger sister Riin Emajõe is also a football player.

References

External links
 
 

1991 births
Living people
Estonian women's footballers
Estonia women's international footballers
Maine Black Bears women's soccer players
People from Põltsamaa
Women's association football forwards
Estonian expatriate footballers
Expatriate women's soccer players in the United States
Estonian expatriate sportspeople in the United States
FC Flora (women) players